Lackawanna Terminal is a former railroad terminal in the township of Montclair, Essex County, New Jersey. Built in 1913, the station was the terminal of the Montclair Branch of the Morris and Essex Lines (part of the Delaware Lackawanna and Western Railroad). The station, boasting four platforms and six tracks, was built by William Hull Botsford, an architect who died in the sinking of the Titanic on April 15, 1912. The station opened on June 28, 1913 in a grand ceremony in Montclair. The station was used until March 2, 1981,  when Conrail and New Jersey Transit moved service to a single platform station at Bay Street as part of the Montclair Connection project. The station was converted to an enclosed shopping mall. 

Listed as the Montclair Railroad Station, it was added to the National Register of Historic Places on January 8, 1973, for its significance in architecture and transportation. There were three main reasons that the station was considered to be qualified for the National Register. One was its architectural significance, including the overall design, the tapestry bond brickwork, the marble concrete trim, the interior brick and tile work and ornamentation, the iron work in the ticket windows. Next factor was the importance of the architect, William Hull Botsford and finally, its importance as a transportation center in the history of Montclair Township.

As of 2019, the complex is threatened with demolition.

Gallery

See also
Operating Passenger Railroad Stations Thematic Resource (New Jersey)
National Register of Historic Places listings in Essex County, New Jersey

References

Buildings and structures in Essex County, New Jersey
Montclair, New Jersey
Railway stations in the United States opened in 1913
Railway stations closed in 1981
Former railway stations in New Jersey
National Register of Historic Places in Essex County, New Jersey
Railway stations on the National Register of Historic Places in New Jersey
Shopping malls in New Jersey
Former Delaware, Lackawanna and Western Railroad stations
1913 establishments in New Jersey
New Jersey Register of Historic Places
Railway stations in Essex County, New Jersey
Repurposed railway stations in the United States